The 2022 USC Trojans football team represented the University of Southern California as a member of the Pac-12 Conference during the 2022 NCAA Division I FBS football season. Led by first-year head coach Lincoln Riley, the Trojans played their home games at the Los Angeles Memorial Coliseum in Los Angeles. They finished the season 11–3, 8–1 in Pac-12 play to earn a trip to the Pac-12 championship game. Ranked No. 4 in the College Football Playoff, they lost to Utah in the conference championship game eliminating them from national championship consideration. They received a bid to the Cotton Bowl Classic where they lost to No. 16-ranked Tulane.

Previous season

The Trojans finished the 2021 season 4–8, 3–6 record in Pac-12 play to finish in a tie for fourth place in the South division. On September 23, 2021, the school fired head coach Clay Helton after starting the season 1–1. Associate head coach Donte Williams was named the team's interim coach making him the team's first ever black head coach. On November 28, the school named Oklahoma coach Lincoln Riley the team's new coach.

Offseason

Coaching staff departures

Transfers

Transfers Out
The Trojans have lost 27 players via transfer.

Transfers In
The Trojans have added 23 players via transfer.

Returning starters

Key departures include : 
Vavae Malepeai (TB – 12 games, 5 started). 
Keaontay Ingram (TB – 10 games, 7 started). 
Drake London (WR – 8 games, 8 started). 
Erik Krommenhoek (TE – 12 games, 10 started).  Jalen McKenzie (OT – 12 games, 6 started).  Liam Jimmons (OG – 12 games, 12 started).  Kana’i Mauga (LB – 12 games, 12 started).  Drake Jackson (OLB – 11 games, 9 started).  Chris Steele (CB – 11 games, 11 started).  Isaac Taylor-Stuart (CB – 11 games, 10 started). 
 Isaiah Pola-Mao (S – 11 games, 9 started).  Greg Johnson (S – 10 games, 9 started).  Ben Griffiths (P – 12 games, 12 started).  Parker Lewis (K – 10 games, 10 started).  Damon Johnson (LS – 12 games, 12 started).

Other departures include : 
Kedon Slovis (QB – 9 games, 9 started).  Jaxson Dart (QB – 6 games, 3 started).  KD Nixon (WR – 10 games).  Michael Trigg (TE – 6 games, 4 started).  Jacob Lichtenstein (DL – 12 games, 8 started).  Hunter Echols (OLB – 11 games, 3 started).  Raymond Scott (LB – 11 games, 3 started).  Chase Williams (S – 12 games, 9 started).

Offense

Defense

Special teams

† Indicates player was a starter in 2021 but missed all of 2022 due to injury.

Recruiting class 
The Trojans signed a total of yet scholarship recruits and walk-ons during national signing period.

Overall class rankings

Recruits

Preseason

Spring Game

Award watch lists 
Listed in the order that they were released

Pac-12 Media Day
The Pac-12 Media Day was held on July 29, 2022 in Hollywood, California with Lincoln Riley (HC), Caleb Williams (QB) and Shane Lee (LB) representing USC.

Preseason All-Pac-12 teams
First Team

Second Team

All-Pac-12 Honorable Mention

Schedule

Personnel

Roster and coaching staff

Depth chart

True Freshman
 
official Depth Chart Week 1 vs Rice (09/01/22)

Injury report

Scholarship distribution chart
 

 
Scholarship Distribution 2022
 
 /  / * Former Walk-on
 
– 80 players on scholarship / 85 scholarships permitted

Game summaries

vs Rice

at Stanford

vs Fresno State

at Oregon State

vs Arizona State

vs Washington State

at No. 20 Utah

at Arizona

vs California

vs Colorado

at No. 16 UCLA

vs No. 15 Notre Dame

vs No. 11 Utah (Pac-12 Championship Game)

With the loss, USC was knocked out of playoff contention, letting Ohio State taking over the #4 seed.

vs No. 16 Tulane (Cotton Bowl)

Rankings

Statistics

Team

Individual Leaders

Offense

Defense

Key: POS: Position, SOLO: Solo Tackles, AST: Assisted Tackles, TOT: Total Tackles, TFL: Tackles-for-loss, SACK: Quarterback Sacks, INT: Interceptions, BU: Passes Broken Up, PD: Passes Defended, QBH: Quarterback Hits, FR: Fumbles Recovered, FF: Forced Fumbles, BLK: Kicks or Punts Blocked, SAF: Safeties, TD : Touchdown

Special teams

Scoring

USC vs. non-conference opponents

USC vs. Pac-12 opponents

USC vs. all opponents

After the season

Awards and honors

Pac-12 Conference Individual Awards

Individual Yearly Awards

All-America

PAC-12 Conference

Bowl games

Senior Bowl

East–West Shrine Bowl

NFLPA Collegiate Bowl

NFL draft

The NFL Draft will be held at Arrowhead Stadium in Kansas City, MO on April 27–29, 2023.
 
Trojans who were picked in the 2023 NFL Draft:

NFL Draft combine
Two members of the 2022 team were invited to participate in drills at the 2023 NFL scouting Combine.
 

† Top performer
 
DNP = Did not participate

USC Pro Day

† Top performer
 
DNP = Did not participate

Notes
 November 28, 2021 – Lincoln Riley Named New USC Football Head Coach.

References

USC
USC Trojans football seasons
USC Trojans football
USC Trojans football